FC International Lion Ngoma d'Ebolowa is a soccer club in the Cameroons. It returned to the Cameroon Première Division in style since their relegation in 2003, finishing eighth with 47 points.

Football clubs in Cameroon
1975 establishments in Cameroon
Sports clubs in Cameroon